The Nicely Formation is a geologic formation in the Crook, Grant, and Harney Counties in Oregon. It preserves radiolaria and ichthyosaur fossils dating back to the Pliensbachian stage of the Early Jurassic period.

Fossil content 
Among others, the following fossils have been reported from the formation:
 Ichthyosauria indet.

See also 
 List of fossiliferous stratigraphic units in Oregon
 Paleontology in Oregon

References

Bibliography 
 
 K. Y. Yeh. 1987. Taxonomic Studies of Lower Jurassic Radiolaria from East-Central Oregon. National Museum of Natural Science Special Publications 2:1-169
 E. A. Pessagno, Jr. and P.A. Whalen. 1982. Lower and Middle Jurassic Radiolaria (multicyrtid Nassellariina) from California, east-central Oregon and the Queen Charlotte Islands, B.C. Micropaleontology 28(2):111-169

Jurassic geology of Oregon
Jurassic System of North America
Pliensbachian Stage
Mudstone formations
Limestone formations of the United States 
Shale formations of the United States
Siltstone formations
Deep marine deposits
Paleontology in Oregon
Formations
Formations
Formations